Wirthlin Worldwide was an American political and business consulting firm founded by Richard Wirthlin in 1969. The company specialized in polls and their interpretation. In addition to political consulting, Wirthlin Worldwide also provided research for non-profits and industry, covering topics such as handwashing behavior after using public toilets, 
post-September 11 charitable giving, the impact of a company's ethical image on consumer purchasing behavior, and preferred methods for purchasing prescription drugs.

It ceased to operate as a separate company on September 8, 2004, when it was sold to Harris Interactive in a deal valued at $42 million.

History 

Originally established as Decision Making Information, Inc,  Wirthlin Worldwide was founded in Los Angeles in 1969 by Dr. Richard Bitner Wirthlin. Wirthlin was an economist with a PhD in economics from the University of California, Berkeley. In 1980, Wirthlin Worldwide was asked to help with the presidential campaign of the then-Governor of California, Ronald Reagan. This led to continued engagements throughout the two terms of President Reagan, including the second presidential campaign.

During its existence, the company went through two name changes, The Wirthlin Group in the 1990s and Wirthlin Worldwide at the beginning of the 21st century. It was finally sold and merged into Harris Interactive in the fall of 2004. The company website was shut down and began redirecting to Harris Interactive on March 16, 2005.

Wirthlin Worldwide won the ARF David Ogilvy Advertising "Grand Winner" Award four times, most recently in 2002 for its research work on the Robert Wood Johnson "Covering Kids" campaign. It ceased to operate as a separate company on September 8, 2004, when it was sold to Harris Interactive in a deal valued at $42 million.

References

External links
 Wirthlin Worldwide at SourceWatch

Public opinion research companies in the United States
Management consulting firms of the United States
International management consulting firms
Political consulting firms
Consulting firms established in 1969
1969 establishments in California
Companies disestablished in 2004
2004 disestablishments in Virginia
2004 mergers and acquisitions
1969 establishments in the United States